Picken may refer to:

Allan Picken (born 1981), Australian professional footballer
Andrew Picken (1788–1833), novelist born in Paisley, Scotland
Bill Picken, Chairman of the Sydney Turf Club (STC)
Billy Picken, former Australian Australian rules footballer
Ebenezer Picken, (1769–1816) Scottish poet and songwriter
Harvie Picken (born 1888), prominent Australian businessman
J. T. Picken, Australian businessman
Jack Picken (1880–1952), Scottish footballer
Joanna Belfrage Picken, (1798–1859), satirist and poet
Laurence Picken (1909–2007), ethnomusicologist and scientist
Liam Picken (born 1986), Australian rules footballer
Marcus Picken (born 1979), former Australian rules footballer
Mary Brooks Picken, influential American author on needlework, sewing, and textile arts
Phil Picken (born 1985), English football player
T. Boone Picken (born 1928), American business magnate and financier
William Picken Alexander (1905–1993), British educator and educational administrator

See also
Piceno (disambiguation)
Pickenia
Pickens (disambiguation)
Picking (disambiguation)
Picon (disambiguation)
Picón